Daniel Ken Inouye (September 7, 1924 – December 17, 2012) was an American lawyer and politician who served as a United States senator from Hawaii from 1963 until his death in 2012.  Beginning in 1959, he was the first U.S. representative for the State of Hawaii, and a Medal of Honor recipient. A member of the Democratic Party, he also served as the president pro tempore of the United States Senate from 2010 until his death. Inouye was the highest-ranking Asian-American politician in U.S. history, until Kamala Harris became vice president in 2021. Inouye also chaired various senate committees, including those on Intelligence, Indian Affairs, Commerce, and Appropriations.

Inouye fought in World War II as part of the 442nd Infantry Regiment. He lost his right arm to a grenade wound and received several military decorations, including the Medal of Honor (the nation's highest military award). He later earned a J.D. degree from George Washington University Law School. Returning to Hawaii, Inouye was elected to Hawaii's territorial House of Representatives in 1953, and was elected to the territorial Senate in 1957. When Hawaii achieved statehood in 1959, Inouye was elected as its first member of the U.S. House of Representatives. He was first elected to the U.S. Senate in 1962. He never lost an election in 58 years as an elected official, and he exercised an exceptionally large influence on Hawaii politics.

Inouye was the second Asian American senator following Hawaii Republican Hiram Fong. Inouye was the first Japanese American to serve in the U.S. House of Representatives and the first Japanese American to serve in the U.S. Senate. Because of his seniority, Inouye became president pro tempore of the Senate following the death of Robert Byrd on June 29, 2010, making him third in the presidential line of succession after the Vice President and the Speaker of the House of Representatives. At the time of his death, Inouye was the most senior sitting U.S. senator, the second-oldest sitting U.S. senator (seven and a half months younger than Frank Lautenberg of New Jersey), and the last sitting U.S. senator to have served during the presidencies of John F. Kennedy, Lyndon B. Johnson, and Richard Nixon.

Inouye was a posthumous recipient of the Presidential Medal of Freedom and the Order of the Paulownia Flowers. Among other public structures, Honolulu International Airport has since been renamed Daniel K. Inouye International Airport in his memory.

Early life (1924–1942)
Daniel Ken Inouye was born in Honolulu, Territory of Hawaii on September 7, 1924. His father, Hyotaro Inouye, was a jeweler who had immigrated to Hawaii from Japan as a child. His mother, Kame (née Imanaga) Inouye, was a homemaker born on Maui to Japanese immigrants. Her parents died young and she was adopted and raised by a family in Honolulu. Both of Daniel's parents were Christian, and met at the River Street Methodist Church in Honolulu. They married in 1923. This heritage makes Daniel a Nisei (second-generation Japanese-American) through his father and a Sansei (third-generation) through his mother. Daniel was named after Kame's adoptive father.

Inouye grew up in Bingham Tract, a Chinese-American enclave in Honolulu. He was raised Christian, and was the oldest of four children. As a child, he collected homing pigeons which he hatched from eggs given to him at an army base in Schofield Barracks in return for him cleaning the coops. As a teenager, he worked on the local beaches teaching tourists how to surf. Inouye's parents raised him and his siblings with a mix of American and Japanese customs. His parents spoke English at home, but had their children attend a private Japanese language school in addition to public school. Inouye dropped out of the Japanese school in 1939 because he disagreed with his instructor's anti-American rhetoric, and focused on his studies at President William McKinley High School. He intended to go to college and medical school after his planned 1942 graduation.

Inouye witnessed the attack on Pearl Harbor on December 7, 1941, while still a senior in high school. The Japanese surprise attack brought the United States into World War II. Being a volunteer first aid instructor with the Red Cross, his supervisor called on him to report to Lunalilo Elementary School which had become a Red Cross station. There, he tended to civilians injured by antiaircraft shells that had fallen into the city. After the United States declared war on Japan the next day, Inouye took up a paid job from his Red Cross supervisor to work there as a medical aide. For the remainder of his senior year, Inouye attended school during the day, and worked at the Red Cross station at night. He graduated from McKinley High School in 1942. Although Inouye wanted to join the armed forces after graduating, he did not possess that right as a Japanese-American. The United States Department of War had declared all Japanese-Americans as "enemy aliens", which stipulated they could not volunteer or be drafted for military service. Inouye enrolled at the University of Hawaiʻi at Mānoa in September 1942 as a premedical student with the goal of becoming a surgeon.

Army service (1943–1947)

In March 1943, US President Franklin D. Roosevelt established the 442nd Regimental Combat Team, an all-Nisei combat unit. Inouye applied and was initially turned down because his work at the Red Cross was deemed critical, but was inducted later that month. The unit was composed of over 2,500 Nisei from Hawaii, and 800 from the mainland. Inouye went with his unit in April to Camp Shelby in Mississippi for a 10-month training period, postponing his medical studies. While in Mississippi, the unit visited the Rohwer War Relocation Center in Arkansas, where Inouye witnessed the internment of Japanese Americans first hand.

The 442nd shipped off to Italy in May 1944 after the conclusion of their training, shortly before the liberation of Rome. Inouye was promoted to sergeant within the first three months of fighting in the Italian countryside north of Rome. The 442nd was then sent to eastern France, where they seized the towns of Bruyères, Belmont, and Biffontaine from the Germans. In late October, the regiment was transferred to the Vosges Mountains region of France, where they rescued 211 members of the 1st Battalion of the 141st Infantry Regiment, otherwise known as the "Lost Battalion". Inouye received a battlefield commission to second lieutenant for his actions there, becoming the youngest officer in his regiment. During the battle, a shot struck him in the chest directly above his heart, but the bullet was stopped by the two silver dollars he happened to have stacked in his shirt pocket. He continued to carry the coins throughout the war in his shirt pocket as good luck charms, but lost them later, shortly before the battle in which he lost his arm. The 442nd spent the next several months near Nice, guarding the French-Italian border until early 1945, when they were called to Northern Italy to assist with an assault on German strongholds in the Apennine Mountains.

Arm injury
On April 21, 1945, Inouye was grievously wounded while leading an assault on the heavily defended Colle Musatello ridge near San Terenzo, Italy. The ridge served as a strongpoint of the German fortifications known as the Gothic Line, the last and most unyielding line of German defensive works in Italy. During a flanking maneuver against German machine gun nests, Inouye was shot in the stomach from 40 yards away. Ignoring his wound, he proceeded with the attack and together with the unit, destroyed the first two machine gun nests. As his squad distracted the third machine gunner, the injured Inouye crawled toward the final bunker and came within 10 yards. As he prepared to toss a grenade within, a German soldier fired out a 30 mm Schiessbecher antipersonnel rifle grenade at Inouye, striking him in the right elbow. Although it failed to detonate, the blunt force of the grenade amputated most of his right arm at the elbow. The nature of the injury caused his arm muscles to involuntarily squeeze the grenade tightly via a reflex arc, preventing his arm from going limp and dropping a live grenade at his feet. This injury left him disabled, in terrible pain, under fire with minimal cover and staring at a live grenade "clenched in a fist that suddenly didn't belong to me anymore."

Inouye's platoon moved to his aid, but he shouted for them to keep back out of fear his severed fist would involuntarily relax and drop the grenade. As the German inside the bunker began reloading his rifle with regular full metal jacket ammunition to finish off Inouye, Inouye pried the live hand grenade from his useless right hand with his left, and tossed it into the bunker, killing the German. Stumbling to his feet, Inouye continued forward, killing at least one more German before sustaining his fifth and final wound of the day in his left leg. Inouye fell unconscious, and awoke to see the worried men of his platoon hovering over him. His only comment before being carried away was to gruffly order them back to their positions, saying "Nobody called off the war!" By the end of the day, the ridge had fallen to American control, without the loss of any soldiers in Inouye's platoon. The remainder of Inouye's mutilated right arm was later amputated at a field hospital without proper anesthesia, as he had been given too much morphine at an aid station and it was feared any more would lower his blood pressure enough to kill him. The war in Europe ended on May 8, less than three weeks later.

Rehabilitation and discharge

Shortly before the Japanese surrender and end of World War II in August 1945, Inouye was shipped back to the United States to recover for eleven months at a rehabilitation center for wounded soldiers in Atlantic City, New Jersey. In mid-1946, Inouye was transferred to the Percy Jones Army Hospital in Battle Creek, Michigan, to continue his rehabilitation for nine more months. While recovering there, Inouye met future Republican senator and presidential candidate Bob Dole, then a fellow patient. The two became friends and would often play bridge together. Dole shared with Inouye his long-term plans to attend law school and become an attorney, and later run for state legislature and eventually the United States Congress. With Inouye's plans to become a surgeon dashed due to his injury, Dole's plans for a career in public service inspired Inouye to consider entering politics. Inouye ultimately beat Dole to congress. The two remained lifelong friends. In 2003, the hospital was renamed the Hart–Dole–Inouye Federal Center in honor of the two World War II veterans, as well as Democratic senator Philip Hart, who had been a patient at the hospital after sustaining injuries on D-Day.

Inouye was honorably discharged with the rank of captain in May 1947 after 20 months of rehabilitation. At the time, he was a recipient of the Bronze Star Medal, Distinguished Service Cross, and three Purple Hearts. Many in his regiment believed that, were he not Japanese-American, he would have been awarded the Medal of Honor, the nation's highest military award. Inouye eventually received the Medal of Honor on June 21, 2000, from President Bill Clinton, along with 19 other Japanese American servicemen in the 442nd.

Entry into politics

Inouye decided to study law hoping it would lead him into a political career. He enrolled at the University of Hawaiʻi at Mānoa in late 1947 as a prelaw student, majoring in government and economics. He relied on the financial benefits of the G.I. Bill to fund his education. When not in class, Inouye would volunteer for the Democratic Party at the Honolulu County Democratic Committee. He had been talked into joining the party by John A. Burns, a former police captain and future governor, who had ties to the Japanese American community. Though the territory of Hawaii had been politically dominated by the Republican Party, Burns convinced Inouye that the Democratic Party could help Japanese Hawaiians achieve social and economic reform. During these years, Inouye met speech instructor Margaret Awamura at the university, whom he married in 1948.

After graduating in 1950, Inouye moved with his wife to Washington D.C. so he could continue his studies at George Washington University Law School. While there, he volunteered at the Democratic National Committee (DNC) headquarters to gain more experience to bring back with him to Hawaii. Inouye earned his J.D. degree in two years, and moved back with his wife to Hawaii in late 1952. Inouye spent the next year studying for the Hawaii bar exam and volunteering with the Democratic Party. After passing the bar exam in August 1953, Inouye was appointed assistant public prosecutor for the city and county of Honolulu by the city mayor and fellow Democrat John Wilson.

At the urging of Burns, Inouye successfully ran for the Hawaii Territorial House of Representatives in the November 1954 election, representing the Fourth District. The election came to be known as the Hawaii Democratic Revolution of 1954, as the long entrenched Republican control of the Hawaii Territorial Legislature abruptly ended with a wave of Democratic candidates taking their seats. The election also filled the legislature with Japanese American politicians, who previously held few seats. Inouye was immediately elected majority leader. He served two terms there, and was elected to the Hawaii territorial senate in 1957. Midway through Inouye's first term in the territorial senate, Hawaii achieved statehood. He won a seat in the U.S. House of Representatives as Hawaii's first full member, and took office on August 21, 1959, the same date Hawaii became a state; he was re-elected in 1960.

United States Senate (1963–2012)

In 1962, he was elected to the U.S. Senate, succeeding retiring fellow Democrat Oren E. Long.

He was the chairman of the Senate Intelligence Committee between 1976 and 1979, and the chairman of the Senate Indian Affairs Committee between 1987 and 1995. He introduced the National Museum of the American Indian Act in 1984 which led to the inauguration of the National Museum of the American Indian in 2004. He was chairman of the Senate Indian Affairs Committee between 2001 and 2003, chairman of the Senate Commerce Committee between 2007 and 2009 and chairman of the Senate Appropriations Committee between 2009 and 2012.

He was reelected eight times, usually without serious difficulty. His closest race was in 1992, when state senator Rick Reed held him to 57 percent of the vote; this was the only time he received less than 69 percent of the vote. He delivered the keynote address at the turbulent 1968 Democratic National Convention in Chicago and gained national attention for his service on the Senate Watergate Committee.

Inouye was also involved in the Iran-Contra investigations of the 1980s, chairing a special committee (Senate Select Committee on Secret Military Assistance to Iran and the Nicaraguan Opposition) from 1987 until 1989. During the hearings, Inouye referred to the operations that had been revealed as a "secret government", saying:

Criticizing the logic of Marine Lt. Colonel Oliver North's justifications for his actions in the affair, Inouye made reference to the Nuremberg trials, provoking a heated interruption from North's attorney Brendan Sullivan, an exchange that was widely repeated in the media at the time. He was also seen as a pro-Taiwan senator and helped in forming the Taiwan Relations Act.

On May 1, 1977, Inouye stated that President Carter had telephoned him to express his objections to a sentence in the Senate Intelligence Committee's report on the Central Intelligence Agency.

On November 20, 1993, Inouye voted against the North American Free Trade Agreement. The trade agreement linked the United States, Canada, and Mexico into a single free trade zone and was signed into law on December 8 by President Bill Clinton.

In 2009, Inouye assumed leadership of the powerful Senate Committee on Appropriations after longtime chairman Robert Byrd stepped down. Following the latter's death on June 28, 2010, Inouye was elected President pro tempore, the officer third in the presidential line of succession.

In 2010, Inouye announced his decision to run for a ninth term. He easily won the Democratic primary—the real contest in this heavily Democratic state—and then trounced Republican state representative Campbell Cavasso with 74 percent of the vote.

Inouye ran for Senate Majority Leader several times without success.

Prior to his death, Inouye announced that he planned to run for a record tenth term in 2016 when he would have been 92 years old. He also said,

1980s
In 1986, West Virginia Senator Robert Byrd opted to run for Senate Majority Leader, believing that his two opponents to claiming the position would be Inouye and Louisiana Senator J. Bennett Johnston. Cutting a deal with Inouye, Byrd pledged that he would step aside from the position in 1989 if Inouye would support him for Senate Majority Leader of the 100th United States Congress. Inouye accepted the offer and was given the chance to select the new Senate sergeant-at-arms.

Foreign policy
In early 1981, Inouye called for tighter restrictions on what Americans can ship overseas, citing his belief that American international stature would be harmed along with the country's foreign policy interests in the event of the shipments causing environmental damage.

In March 1981, Inouye was one of 24 elected officials to issue a joint statement calling on the Reagan administration to compose a method of finding a peaceful solution that would end The Troubles in Northern Ireland.

In July 1981, a Federal commission began hearings to decide on rewarding compensations to Japanese-Americans placed in internment camps during World War II, Inouye and fellow Hawaii Senator Spark M. Matsunaga delivering opening statements. In November, during an appearance at the opening of a 10-day public forum at Tufts University on Japanese internment, Inouye stated his opposition to distributing reparation fees for Japanese-Americans previously incarcerated during World War II, adding that it "would be insulting even to try to do so." In August 1988, Inouye attended President Reagan's signing of legislation apologizing for the internment camps and establishing a $1.25 billion trust fund to pay reparations to both those who were placed in camps and to their families. In September 1989, during the Senate's debate over bestowing reparations to Japanese-Americans interned during World War II, Inouye delivered his first public speech on the issue and noted $22,000 were bestowed to each captive American in the Iran hostage crisis.

In October 2002, Inouye was one of 23 senators who voted against authorization of the use of military force in Iraq.

Domestic policy 
In March 1982, amid controversy surrounding Democratic Senator Harrison A. Williams for taking bribes in the Abscam sting operation, Inouye delivered a closing defense argument stating the possibility of the Senate looking foolish in the event the conviction was reversed on appeal. Inouye confirmed that he had received telephone calls regarding Williams critiquing his remarks during his defense of himself the previous week and questioned if the Senate was going to punish him "because his presentation was rambling, not in the tradition of Daniel Webster" and for his wife believing in him.

In October 1982, after President Reagan appointed two new members to the board of the Legal Services Corporation, Inouye was one of 32 Senators to sign a letter expressing grave concerns over the appointments.

On December 23, Inouye voted against a 5 cent a gallon increase in gasoline taxes across the US imposed to aid the financing of highway repairs and mass transit. The bill passed on the last day of the 97th United States Congress.

In March 1984, Inouye voted against a constitutional amendment authorizing periods in public school for silent prayer and against President Reagan's unsuccessful proposal for a constitutional amendment permitting organized school prayer in public schools. In August, Inouye secured the acceptance of the Senate's defense appropriations subcommittee for an amendment meant to cure mainland milk arriving at Hawaiian and Alaskan military bases sour, arguing thousands of gallons of milk coming from the mainland must be dumped due to their souring and said shipments were arriving eight days after pasteurization.

In February 1989, after Oliver North went on trial in Federal District Court amid accusations of a dozen crimes in accordance with his role in diverting profits from the secret sale of arms to Iran to the Nicaraguan rebels and Jack Brooks questioned North's role in composing a "contingency plan in the event of an emergency that would suspend the American Constitution," Inouye replied that the inquiry touched on both a classified and sensitive matter that would only be discussed in a closed session.

Gang of 14

On May 23, 2005, Inouye was a member of a bipartisan group of 14 moderate senators, known as the Gang of 14, to forge a compromise on the Democrats' use of the judicial filibuster, thus blocking the Republican leadership's attempt to implement the "nuclear option," a means of forcibly ending a filibuster. Under the agreement, the Democrats would retain the power to filibuster a Bush judicial nominee only in an "extraordinary circumstance," and the three most conservative Bush appellate court nominees (Janice Rogers Brown, Priscilla Owen, and William H. Pryor, Jr.) would receive a vote by the full U.S. Senate.

Electoral history

Inouye never lost an election.

In August 1968, President Lyndon B. Johnson placed a phone call to vice president and Democratic presumptive presidential nominee Hubert Humphrey, urging him to select Inouye as his running mate. Johnson went as far as to request a background check on Inouye from the Federal Bureau of Investigation. Johnson told Humphrey that Inouye's World War II injuries would silence Humphrey's critics on the Vietnam War: "He answers Vietnam with that empty sleeve. He answers your problems with (Republican presumptive presidential nominee and former vice president Richard) Nixon with that empty sleeve", Johnson said. Humphrey eventually chose Edmund Muskie as his running mate, and lost the election. According to his chief of staff, Jennifer Sabas, Inouye knew that he was being considered as a vice presidential pick, but was uninterested in the possibility, apparently content with his current position.

Family

Inouye's first wife was Margaret "Maggie" Shinobu Awamura, who was working as a speech instructor at the University of Hawaiʻi when Inouye was attending as a prelaw student after the war. The two married on June 12, 1948, at the Harris Memorial Methodist Church in Honolulu. She died of cancer on March 13, 2006. On May 24, 2008, he married Irene Hirano in a private ceremony in Beverly Hills, California. Hirano was president and founding chief executive officer of the Japanese American National Museum in Los Angeles, California. She resigned the position at the time of her marriage, in order to be closer to her husband. According to the Honolulu Advertiser, Inouye was 24 years older than Hirano. On May 27, 2010, Hirano was elected chair of the nation's second largest non-profit organization, The Ford Foundation. Hirano outlived him by more than seven years; she died on April 7, 2020.

Inouye's son Kenny was the guitarist for the hardcore punk band Marginal Man.

Honors

 Golden Plate Award of the American Academy of Achievement in 1968.
 Grand Cross of the Philippine Legion of Honor in 1993.
 On June 21, 2000, Inouye was presented the Medal of Honor by President Bill Clinton for his service during World War II.
 In 2000, Inouye was awarded the Grand Cordon of the Order of the Rising Sun by the Emperor of Japan in recognition of his long and distinguished career in public service.
 In 2006, the U.S. Navy Memorial awarded Inouye its Naval Heritage award for his support of the U.S. Navy and the military during his terms in the Senate.
 Grand Cross (Bayani) of the Order of Lakandula on August 14, 2006.
 In 2007, Inouye was personally inducted as a Chevalier of the Legion of Honor by President of France Nicolas Sarkozy.
 In February 2009, a bill was introduced in the Philippine House of Representatives by Rep. Antonio Diaz seeking to confer honorary Filipino citizenship on Inouye, Senators Ted Stevens and Daniel Akaka, and Representative Bob Filner for their role in securing the passage of benefits for Filipino World War II veterans.
 In June 2011, Inouye was appointed a Grand Cordon of the Order of the Paulownia Flowers, the highest Japanese honor which may be conferred upon a foreigner who is not a head of state. Only the seventh American to be so honored, he is also the first American of Japanese descent to receive it. The conferment of the order was "to recognize his continued significant and unprecedented contributions to the enhancement of goodwill and understanding between Japan and the United States."
 In 2011, Philippine president Benigno Aquino III conferred Order of Sikatuna upon Inouye. He had previously been awarded Order of Lakandula and a Philippine Republic Presidential Unit Citation.
 Inouye was inducted as an honorary member of the Navajo Nation and titled "The Leader Who Has Returned With a Plan."
 On August 8, 2013, Inouye was posthumously awarded the Presidential Medal of Freedom by President Barack Obama. The citation in the press release reads as follows:
Daniel Inouye was a lifelong public servant. As a young man, he fought in World War II with the 442nd Regimental Combat Team, for which he received the Medal of Honor. He was later elected to the Hawaii Territorial House of Representatives, the United States House of Representatives, and the United States Senate. Senator Inouye was the first Japanese American to serve in Congress, representing the people of Hawaii from the moment they joined the Union.

Awards and decorations

On May 27, 1947, Inouye was honorably discharged and returned home as a Captain with a Distinguished Service Cross, Bronze Star Medal, two Purple Hearts, and 12 other medals and citations. In 2000, his Distinguished Service Cross was upgraded to the Medal of Honor.

Death

In 2012, Inouye began using a wheelchair in the Senate to preserve his knees, and received an oxygen concentrator to aid his breathing. In November 2012, he sustained a minor cut after falling in his apartment and was treated at Walter Reed National Military Medical Center. On December 6, he was again hospitalized at George Washington University Hospital so doctors could further regulate his oxygen intake, and was transferred to Walter Reed Medical Center on December 10. He died there of respiratory complications seven days later on December 17, 2012. According to the senator's Congressional website, his last word was "Aloha." Prior to his death, Inouye left a letter encouraging Governor Neil Abercrombie to appoint Colleen Hanabusa to succeed Inouye should he become incapacitated; instead Abercrombie appointed Hawaii's Lieutenant Governor Brian Schatz.

Senate Majority Leader Harry Reid announced Inouye's death on the floor of the Senate, referring to Inouye as "certainly one of the giants of the Senate." Senate Minority Leader Mitch McConnell referred to Inouye as one of the finest Senators in United States history. President Barack Obama referred to him as a "true American hero".

Inouye's body lay in state at the United States Capitol rotunda on December 20, 2012. President Obama, former President Bill Clinton, Vice President Joe Biden, House Speaker John Boehner and Senate Majority Leader Harry Reid spoke at a funeral service at the Washington National Cathedral on December 21. Inouye's body was then flown to Hawaii where it lay in state at the Hawaii State Capitol on December 22. A second funeral service was held at the National Memorial Cemetery of the Pacific in Honolulu the following day.

Legacy
The Daniel K. Inouye Graduate School of Nursing, founded in 1993, is part of the Uniformed Services University of the Health Sciences.

He made a cameo appearance as himself in the 1994 film The Next Karate Kid, giving the opening speech at Arlington National Cemetery for a commendation for Japanese-Americans who fought in the 442nd Regimental Combat Team during World War II.

In 2007, The Citadel dedicated Inouye Hall at the Citadel/South Carolina Army National Guard Marksmanship Center to Senator Inouye, who helped make the Center possible.

In May 2013, Secretary of the Navy Ray Mabus announced that the next  would be named . The destroyer was officially christened at Bath Iron Works on June 22, 2019.

In November 2013, the National Asian Pacific American Bar Association renamed its Trailblazer Award in honor of Inouye, posthumously honoring him with the Senator Daniel K. Inouye NAPABA Trailblazer Award.

In December 2013, the Advanced Technology Solar Telescope at Haleakala Observatory on Maui was renamed the Daniel K. Inouye Solar Telescope.

Numerous federal properties at Joint Base Pearl Harbor–Hickam and around Hawai'i have been dedicated to Senator Inouye, including the National Oceanic and Atmospheric Administration Daniel K. Inouye Regional Center (2013), the Hawaii Air National Guard Daniel K. Inouye Fighter Squadron Operations & Aircraft Maintenance Facility (2014), the Senator Daniel K. Inouye Defense POW/MIA Accounting Agency building (2015), the Daniel K. Inouye Asia-Pacific Center for Security Studies at Fort Derussy (2015), and the Pacific Missile Range Facility Daniel K. Inouye Range and Operations Center on Kauai (2016).

In 2014, Israel named the simulator room of the Arrow anti-missile defense system in his honor, the first time that a military facility has been named after a foreign national.

A Boeing C-17 Globemaster III, tail number 5147, of the 535th Airlift Squadron, was dedicated Spirit of Daniel Inouye on August 20, 2014.

The Parade Field at Fort Benning was rededicated to honor Senator Inouye on September 12, 2014.

On April 27, 2017, Honolulu's airport was renamed Daniel K. Inouye International Airport in his honor.

In 2018, Honolulu-based Matson, Inc. named its newest container ship, the largest built in the United States, the Daniel K. Inouye.

The University of Hawai‘i at Hilo dedicated its pharmacy college the Daniel K. Inouye College of Pharmacy (DKICP) on December 4, 2019.

In August 2021, while visiting Japan for the Tokyo Olympics, First Lady Jill Biden dedicated a room in the U.S. ambassador's residence to Inouye and his wife, Irene.

See also 

 List of Asian American Medal of Honor recipients for World War II
 List of Asian Americans in the United States Congress
 List of United States Congress members who died in office

References

Bibliography

Further reading
 Winston, Mitch. Senator Daniel Inouye: WW II Hero and America Finest Senator (2022), Democrat of Hawaii

External links

 Daniel K. Inouye Institute
 
 

 
1924 births
2012 deaths
20th-century American politicians
21st-century American politicians
American amputees
American military personnel of Japanese descent
American politicians of Japanese descent
American politicians with disabilities
American United Methodists
American writers of Japanese descent
Asian-American members of the United States House of Representatives
Asian-American United States senators
Burials in the National Memorial Cemetery of the Pacific
Chevaliers of the Légion d'honneur
Deaths from respiratory failure
Democratic Party members of the United States House of Representatives from Hawaii
Democratic Party United States senators from Hawaii
George Washington University Law School alumni
George Washington University trustees
Grand Cordons of the Order of the Rising Sun
Grand Crosses of the Order of Lakandula
Hawaii politicians of Japanese descent
Members of the Hawaii Territorial Legislature
Members of the United States Congress of Japanese descent
Military personnel from Hawaii
Politicians from Honolulu
Presidential Medal of Freedom recipients
Presidents pro tempore of the United States Senate
Recipients of the Four Freedoms Award
Recipients of the Order of the Paulownia Flowers
United States Army Medal of Honor recipients
United States Army officers
United States Army personnel of World War II
University of Hawaiʻi at Mānoa alumni
Watergate scandal investigators
World War II recipients of the Medal of Honor